Conus purpurascens, common name the purple cone, is a species of sea snail, a marine gastropod mollusk in the family Conidae, the cone snails and their allies.

Like all species within the genus Conus, these snails are predatory and venomous. They are capable of "stinging" humans, therefore live ones should be handled carefully or not at all. Conantokin-P is a toxin derived from the venom of Conus purpurascens.

Description
The size of the shell varies between 33 mm and 80 mm. The shell is broad-shouldered, with a rude, striate spire. It is striate below, and the string sometimes is slightly granular. The shell is clouded with white or violaceous and brown or olive, with close lines of chestnut and white minute articulations. Sometimes it is irregularly white-banded in the middle.

The color variations of this handsome species are dazzling, but the general habit of the shell is quite constant.

(Original description of Conus purpurascens var. rejectus Dall, 1910) This variety has the nebulous brown very pale and scattered in very small patches over a pale purple or bluish ground color. The whole surface in front of the shoulder is rather closely painted with pale brown, thread-like, articulate, spiral lines. The pale lateral band is still notable. The spire is somewhat lower and the shoulder more angular than usual. The spire is ornamented with a few radiating brown flammules, the sutural fasciole is excavated, smooth, or with only one or two obsolete spiral striae.

Distribution
This species occurs in the Central Pacific, off the Galapagos Islands and in the Gulf of California, Mexico.

References

 Petit, R. E. (2009). George Brettingham Sowerby, I, II & III: their conchological publications and molluscan taxa. Zootaxa. 2189: 1–218
  Puillandre N., Duda T.F., Meyer C., Olivera B.M. & Bouchet P. (2015). One, four or 100 genera? A new classification of the cone snails. Journal of Molluscan Studies. 81: 1–23

External links
 The Conus Biodiversity website
Cone Shells - Knights of the Sea
 

purpurascens
Gastropods described in 1833
Taxa named by George Brettingham Sowerby I